Nartanasala is a 1963 Indian Telugu-language Hindu mythological film directed by Kamalakara Kameswara Rao and written by Samudrala Sr. It stars N. T. Rama Rao, Savitri, S. V. Ranga Rao, and Relangi while Mukkamala, Mikkilineni and Dandamudi Rajagopal play supporting roles among others. Susarla Dakshinamurthi composed the film's soundtrack and background score. M. A. Rahman and S. P. S. Veerappa served as the cinematographer and editor respectively. T. V. S. Sarma was the film's art director. The film was produced by actress C. Lakshmi Rajyam and her husband C. Sridhar Rao under the Rajyam Pictures banner.

Based on the Virata Parva of the Indian epic Mahabharata, Nartanasala focused on the trials of the Pandavas in the last year of their exile. The Pandavas assumed different identities and lived incognito in Virata Matsya Kingdom. The Kauravas wished to reveal the Pandavas' real identities so that they would repeat another exile of 13 years in a cyclic fashion. The issues faced by the Pandavas and their wife Draupadi at Matsya due to various factors, notably Virata's brother-in-law Kichaka form the rest of the story.

The majority of Nartanasala portions were filmed in the sets erected at Vauhini and Bharani studios in Madras (now Chennai). Produced with a budget of 4,00,000, Nartanasala was released on 11 October 1963 in 26 centers. The film was a commercial success, completing a 100-day run in 19 centers and a 200-day run in two centers. It was also dubbed into Bengali and Odia languages. Nartanasala won the National Film Award for Second Best Feature Film and the Filmfare Award for Best Film – Telugu. At the third Afro-Asian Film Festival held at Jakarta in 1964, Nartanasala received two awards: Best Male Actor (Ranga Rao) and Best Art Director (T. V. S. Sarma). For the April 2013 centennial of Indian cinema, News18 included Nartanasala in its list of "The 100 greatest Indian films of all time".

Plot 
The Pandavas complete 12 years of forest life as a part of their 13-year exile stipulation of a rigged dice game they were defeated in by the Kauravas. As per the rule, in the 13th year, the Pandavas and their wife Draupadi have to assume different identities and live incognito until the upcoming Vijayadasami. In case their real identity is unveiled, they have to repeat their 13-year exile. That would give a chance to the Kauravas to stop the Pandavas from attacking and gaining the reigns of the Kuru Kingdom for a longer period, and possibly forever. The Pandavas choose the Matsya Kingdom ruled by Virata, a kind-hearted but weak-spirited king. They hope to find employment in the king's palace.

Arjuna, one of the Pandavas, recollects a curse that could help him stay incognito for one year. In the past, Arjuna was felicitated by Indra, the king of deities for gaining the divine weapon, Pasupatastra, from Lord Siva through dedicated devotion. The celestial dancer Urvasi falls in love with Arjuna, but he rejects her advances as he considered her a motherly figure. Feeling insulted, Urvasi cursed him to lose his masculinity and turn into a eunuch. Indra arrived and asked Arjuna to treat this curse as a blessing in disguise as the 13th year is arriving. Taking this into account, Arjuna turns into a transgender dance teacher Brihannala.

The remaining assume different identities based on their strengths  Dharma Raju (Yudhishthira) as the advisor and dice player Kankubhattu, Bhima as the cook Valabha, Nakula as horse groomsman Damagranthi, Sahadeva as cowherd Tantripala. Draupadi meets Virata's wife Sudeshna at a temple. She introduces herself as Sairandhri, an ill-fated woman married to five Gandharvas, and requests a job in her palace. Sudeshna agrees and promises that Sairandhri would never be used to perform unethical tasks and jobs. The Pandavas too join Virata's palace in these disguised forms and perform various duties. The Kauravas are in search of the Pandavas and their cousin Krishna learns about this. Arjuna's son Abhimanyu wishes to convey the same to the Pandavas and Krishna reluctantly agrees. Before sending him to Matsya, Krishna warns Abhimanyu not to reveal his real identity. Abhimanyu falls in love with Virata's daughter Uttara but does not reveal any details of his. Bruhannala, who teaches dance to Uttara, learns this and is happy. Uttara's brother Uttara Kumara too, wishes to see their alliance turn into a reality and waits for the opportunity.

Sudeshna's brother and Matsya's chief army commander Kichaka returns victorious from a conquest. Kichaka sees Sairandhri and is mesmerized by her beauty. He warns Sudeshna of dire consequences if Sairandhri does not willingly submit herself for unison. As Kichaka is the supreme power of Matsya, Virata and Sudeshna do not dare to oppose him. Sairandhri warns and pleads to Kichaka several times, which bear no result. One night, Valala disguises himself as a woman and waits in the dance hall. Believing the woman to be Sairandhri, Kichaka enters the hall and is killed by Valala. Valala also kills Kichaka's hundred brothers who attempt to kill Sairandhri by making her perform Sati with Kichaka's corpse.

The Kauravas learn about Kichaka's death due to a woman married to five Gandharvas in mysterious circumstances. They suspect that the Pandavas are hidden in Matsya and launch an attack on the kingdom's cattle. With all the soldiers engaged in war with Kauravas' allies, Virata's palace is almost empty. When Kauravas attack the remaining cattle, Uttara Kumara swears to fight against them. However, after watching their military troops, Uttara Kumara loses his confidence. Bruhannala, who is his charioteer, volunteers to fight if Uttara Kumara handles the chariot, to which Uttara Kumara agrees.

Before the war, Bruhannala asks the chariot to be directed to a Shami tree (prosopis cineraria) where the Pandavas' divine weapons are hidden. The 13th year ends on that day and Bruhannala regains his form of Arjuna. On realizing who Bruhannala is, Uttara Kumara is happy to serve him. Arjuna then uses the Sammohanastra weapon, which puts the Kaurava army to sleep. The cattle are rescued and the Pandavas declare that their 13-year exile has been completed. Krishna visits Matsya and the marriage of Uttaraa with Abhimanyu is finalized.

Cast 

N. T. Rama Rao as Arjuna and Bruhannala
Savitri as Draupadi and Sairandhri
S. V. Ranga Rao as Kichaka
Relangi as Uttara Kumara
Dandamudi Rajagopal as Bhima and Valabha
Mukkamala as Virata
Mikkilineni as Dharma Raju and Kankubhattu
Sobhan Babu as Abhimanyu
Dhulipala as Duryodhana
Prabhakar Reddy as Karna
Satyanarayana as Dusaasana
Allu Ramalingaiah as Vaalatulya
Vangara as Assistant Cook
Boddapati as Assistant Cook
Balakrishna as Assistant Cook
Ramakoti as Assistant Cook
L. Vijayalakshmi as Uttaraa
Sandhya as Sudeshna
Padmini Priyadarshini as Urvasi

Cameo appearances
Kanchanamala
Suryakantham
Kanta Rao as Krishna
C. Lakshmi Rajyam as Subhadra
Nellore Kantharao as Jeemutha Mallu

Production

Development 
Nartanasala was produced by an actress C. Lakshmi Rajyam and her husband C. Sridhar Rao under the banner Rajyam Pictures. The film's story was based on Virata Parva, one of the eighteen books of the Indian epic Mahabharata. Rajyam and Rao felt that barring Keechaka Vadham (19161918) and Vijayadasami (1937), no other Indian film dared to explore Virata Parva and found it a unique premise. Also, the belief that reading Virata Parva in Telugu-speaking lands would result in heavy rainfalls made the subject a culturally significant one. Samudrala Raghavacharya, better known as Samudrala Sr., wrote Nartanasala script and Kamalakara Kameswara Rao was chosen to direct the film. Nartanasala was Kameswara Rao's first mythological film.

Susarla Dakshinamurthi composed the film's music; M. A. Rahman and S. P. S. Veerappa served as the cinematographer and editor, respectively. T. V. S. Sarma was the film's art director. Raavi Kondala Rao, one of the assistant directors, wrote the dialogue for the comedy portions on Kameswara Rao's insistence. He also added the character of Vaalatulya (played by Allu Ramalingaiah), which was absent in the original script. Though Kameswara Rao offered to credit Kondala Rao as the first assistant director, the makers altogether left his name out later.

Casting 
Rajyam and Rao approached N. T. Rama Rao to play Arjuna role in the film. Rama Rao was happy to play Arjuna, but was hesitant to take up Bruhannala part; he felt that even a slight misstep would result in rejection by the audience. Rajyam assured that Sarma's sketches would help Rama Rao look authentic. Sarma designed the look based on eunuch statues in major temples and opted for Keralite hairstyles. Bengali makeup artist Haripada Chandra was signed to work on Rama Rao's work. After getting approval from his mentor K. V. Reddy on Bruhannala's look, Rama Rao agreed to be a part of the film's cast.

Savitri and S. V. Ranga Rao was signed to play the other key roles of Draupadi and Kichaka respectively. Mikkilineni, Dhulipala Seetarama Sastry, Mukkamala and Relangi played supporting roles. Wrestlers Dandamudi Rajagopal and Nellore Kantharao were signed to play Bhima and Jeemutha Mallu respectively. Kanta Rao made a brief appearance as Krishna and Rajyam played his sister Subhadra. Sobhan Babu and L. Vijayalakshmi were paired to play the couple Abhimanyu and Uttaraa. This was Sobhan Babu's first of two films where he portrayed the character of Abhimanyu, the other being Veerabhimanyu (1965). On Rajyam's insistence, actress Kanchanamala made a cameo appearance. She shared the screen with Suryakantham in the film. It was Kanchanamala's last on-screen appearance.

Filming 
The majority of Nartanasala portions were filmed in the sets erected at Vauhini and Bharani studios in Madras (now Chennai). All the musical instruments used in the film were borrowed from the Madras Sangeetha Vidyalaya. The war sequences in the climax portion were filmed at Gudur, a town in Andhra Pradesh; two cameras were simultaneously used to film the scenes. For the Gograhana (retrieving the kidnapped cows) episode, five thousand animals were brought with the help of Gogineni Venkateswara Rao. Nartanasala was produced on a budget of 4,00,000 with a runtime of 174 minutes.

When Raghavacharya fell ill, his son Samudrala Ramanujacharya (better known as Samudrala Jr.), wrote the monologue "Sandhaana Samayamidi Inkanu Sairandhri Raalede ..." (It is time for unison and Sairandhri hasn't turned up yet ...) for Ranga Rao. Since Bruhannala was a dance teacher and Vijayalakshmi, who played Uttaraa, was a trained classical dancer, Rama Rao took two-hour long daily lessons from the film's choreographer Vempati Pedha Satyam for a month. Satyam also held three-day rehearsals for Sobhan Babu with Vijayalakshmi to help him overcome his nervousness. For the scene where Sairandhri was tied to a pole and dragged on a cart, Kameswara Rao employed a body double. When the intended artist did not turn up, another was employed and the scene was filmed. This made Kameswara Rao remark, "so now we have a dupe for a dupe ".

Music 
Susarla Dakshinamurthi composed the film's soundtrack and background score. Nartanasala soundtrack, marketed by Saregama, consists of 21 tracks including songs, poems, and collection of selected dialogue from the film. Out of 21 songs produced, only nine are used in the film. Raghavacharya and Sri Sri penned the lyrics for the songs. P. V. Koteswara Rao of Bharani Studios worked on the re-recording and songs. RCA and Western Electric sound systems were used for the same.

The song "Salalitha Raaga Sudharasa" is based on the Kalyani raga of the carnatic music. The makers were initially reluctant with the song's classic nature and insisted to change it. When Dakshinamurthi and Raghavacharya completed work on a new version, Kondala Rao and Satyam requested the makers to retain the previous version. Due to the unavailability of singers Ghantasala and S. Janaki, Dakshinamurthi chose musician M. Balamuralikrishna and Bangalore Latha to provide the vocals. The song "Jaya Gana Nayaka" is a ragamalika composition and is based on three ragasGambhiranata, Todi, and Punnagavarali.

Nartanasala is one of Dakshinamurthi's critically acclaimed works in Telugu cinema. M. L. Narasimham of The Hindu noted that Dakshinamurthi's "melodious" background score contributed largely to the film's success. "Salalitha Raaga Sudharasa" gained the status of a chartbuster, while "Janani Siva Kamini" gained recognition as a prayer song. Other successful songs of Nartanasala were "Dariki Raboku", "Sakhiya Vivarinchave", "Evarikosam Ee Mandahasam", and "Naravara O Kuruvara".

Release and reception 

Nartanasala was released on 11 October 1963 in 26 centres. Navayuga Films acquired the film's distribution rights. Katragadda Narsaiah of Navayuga worked on the film's posters and publicity. The film was commercially successful, managing to have a theatrical run of 100 days in 19 centres and 200 days in Hyderabad and Vijayawada. According to The Hindu, Nartanasala complete theatrical run lasted for 25 weeks. The film's Bengali and Odia dubbed versions were commercially successful on par with the original. Nartanasala was adjudged the second best feature film at the 11th National Film Awards. It won the Filmfare Award for Best Film – Telugu. At the 3rd Afro-Asian Film Festival held at Jakarta in 1964, Nartanasala received two awards: best male actor (Ranga Rao) and best art director (Sarma).

In its 87th volume released in 1966, the now-defunct magazine The Illustrated Weekly of India noted Kanchanamala's cameo appearance, stating, "her delivery was as flawless as in bygone days and the years had not robbed her of charm". Reviewing Nartanasala, the University of Iowa stated that the film "unfolds in a near-operatic style reminiscent of many genres of Indian folk theatre". Rama Rao's performance as Bruhannala was praised: "Rao manages the transition well, swishing about in glittery drag and affecting exaggeratedly feminine mannerisms". The reviewer also found Kanta Rao's portrayal of Krishna "suitably charming, with an enigmatic style". M. L. Narasimham of The Hindu noted that the film provided one of the most fulfilling performances for Savitri as Sairandhri. On its 45th anniversary, Telugu newspaper Sakshi praised the performances of Rama Rao and Ranga Rao as Bruhannala and Keechaka respectively; the newspaper termed the former a "strange adventure" considering the actor's stardom.

Legacy 
Nartanasala success inspired filmmakers to explore the theme of a protagonist with a dark past living with a different identity in a place alien to him. The film's success also earned recognition to Padmini Priyadarshini (who played Urvashi in the film) as a dancer in South Indian cinema. In May 2012, Radhika Rajamani of Rediff.com mentioned Nartanasala for the letter N in her list, "The A to Z of Telugu Cinema". In November 2012, The Times of India listed Nartanasala along with other unrelated films such as Missamma (1955), Mayabazar (1957), Gundamma Katha (1962), and Bommarillu (2006) in the list "Telugu classics to watch along with family this Deepavali". The commentator for The Times praised the songs, the overall treatment and Ranga Rao's portrayal of Kichaka. For the April 2013 centennial of Indian cinema, News18 included Nartanasala in its list of "The 100 greatest Indian films of all time". In the Telugu film Bhale Manchi Roju (2015), the old theatre from where the villain (played by P. Sai Kumar) operates is named Nartanasala after this film.

Cancelled remake 
Rama Rao's son and actor Nandamuri Balakrishna announced Nartanasala remake in 2004. Apart from directing the remake, Balakrishna played a dual role in the remakethose of Arjuna and Kichaka. Soundarya was signed to play Draupadi with Srihari, Sarath Babu, Uday Kiran and Asin cast in supporting roles. The remake's principal photography commenced on 1 March 2004. The remake was shelved later due to the death of Soundarya in an accident. In an interview with The Times of India in August 2014, Balakrishna said that he could not imagine anyone other than Soundarya for the character and after her death, he called off the film with no intention to revive it.

Notes

References

Bibliography

External links 
 

1960s Telugu-language films
1962 films
Films based on the Mahabharata
Films directed by Kamalakara Kameswara Rao
Films scored by Susarla Dakshinamurthi
Hindu mythological films
Indian dance films
Indian epic films
1960s historical musical films
Indian historical musical films
Indian nonlinear narrative films
Second Best Feature Film National Film Award winners